"Dr. Pierce and Mr. Hyde" was the 29th episode of the television series M*A*S*H, and the fifth episode of season two.

Plot
After three straight days of surgery, an over-exhausted Hawkeye is unable to sleep. In his disillusion, he decides to find out who is responsible for the war. One of the things Hawkeye does is that he has Radar O'Reilly send off a telegram to President Harry S. Truman demanding to know who started the war. This draws the ire of General Clayton. After he chews out Henry Blake, Blake orders Trapper to find a way to put Hawkeye to sleep.

See also
"Der Fuehrer's Face", song sung by Hawkeye
"I'll Be Home for Christmas", song sung by Hawkeye

References

External links

M*A*S*H (season 2) episodes
1973 American television episodes
Television episodes directed by Jackie Cooper